Epping Upland is a village and civil parish in the Epping Forest district of Essex, England.

Epping Upland parish church is dedicated to All Saints, with the Epping Upland ecclesiastical parish part of the Diocese of Chelmsford. The church dates to the 13th century and is Grade II* listed.

Until the Dissolution of the Monasteries, All Saints was under the jurisdiction of Waltham Abbey. In the first half of the 19th century part of today's town of Epping was within the civil parish of Epping Upland and was part of the ecclesiastical parish centred on All Saints'. The south-eastern urban and market part of Epping Upland joined the hamlet of Epping Street to become the town of Epping. In 1831 the village of Epping Upland had a population of 427 within 83 houses. At the time, eighty percent of the village population, and forty percent of the parish, were employed in agriculture.

Among further listed Epping Upland village buildings is Takeleys, a Grade II timber-framed house, as part of a moated site, which dates to the 16th century (Pevsner: early 17th), with 18th-century alterations. It contains an "elaborately carved" chimney piece and, in an upper room, 17th-century brown and black wall paintings in floral style on plasterwork.

On 8 September 1944, during the Second World War, the first German V-2 rocket to be launched landed at Epping Upland.

The local primary school is Epping Upland C of E Primary School.

Epping Upland has bus services to Epping and Harlow.

Civil parish
The village of Epping Green and the hamlets of Jacks Hatch and Rye Hill are situated just inside the northern edge of the civil parish.

In 2001 the population of Epping Upland Parish was 790, increasing to 831 at the 2011 Census.

The parish includes the earthwork remains of the scheduled Ambresbury Banks, an Iron Age hill fort.

References

External links 

Epping Upland Parish Council
Epping Upland CE Primary School
All Saints Church, Epping Upland
Epping Forest District Council
Essex County Council 

Villages in Essex
Epping Forest District
Civil parishes in Essex